Megalomania is an obsession with power and wealth, and a passion for grand schemes.

Megalomania or megalomaniac may also refer to:

Psychology 
 Narcissistic personality disorder
 Grandiose delusions
 Omnipotence (psychoanalysis), a stage of child development

Albums 
 Megalomania (Aqua album), 2011
 Mania velichia or Megalomania, a 1985 album by Aria
 Megalomania (Enslavement of Beauty album), 2001
 Megalomania, a 2014 album by Kissin' Dynamite

Songs 
 "Megalomaniac" (Incubus song), 2004
 "Megalomaniac" (KMFDM song), 1997
 "Megalomania" (Muse song), a 2001 song by Muse from Origin of Symmetry
 "Megalomania", a 1975 song by Black Sabbath from Sabotage
 "Megalomania", a 1983 song by the Blood from False Gestures for a Devious Public
 "Megalomania", a 1992 song by Pele from Fireworks
 "Megalomania", a 1991 song by Therion from Of Darkness...

Other 
 Mega-Lo-Mania, a 1991 real-time strategy game by Sensible Software

See also 
 "Megalovania", a 2015 song by Toby Fox  used in several video games
 Delusions of grandeur (disambiguation)